The Supreme Court of Rwanda is the highest court of Rwanda, as defined by Article 143 of the 2003 Constitution of Rwanda. Article 144 of the Constitution determines that the Supreme Court is the highest jurisdiction in the country. Article 145 empowers the Supreme Court to coordinate and oversee the activities of the lower courts and tribunals, while ensuring judicial independence.

References

Courts of Rwanda